Yngve Gamlin (17 March 1926 – 1 February 1995) was a Swedish actor and film director. His 1965 film The Chasers was entered into the 16th Berlin International Film Festival where it won the Silver Bear Extraordinary Jury Prize.

Gamlin was also President of the humorous micronation the Republic of Jamtland from 1963 to 1983.

Filmography

References

External links

1926 births
1995 deaths
Micronational leaders
Swedish male film actors
Swedish film directors
20th-century Swedish male actors